WTNO-CD (channel 22) is a low-power, Class A   television station in New Orleans, Louisiana, United States, affiliated with the Spanish-language network Estrella TV. The station is owned by HC2 Holdings, and maintains offices on Caneel Court in Terrytown; its transmitter is located on Airline Drive/US 61 in Metairie.

History 
The station's construction permit was issued on August 28, 1989, under the calls of K22DJ. It then changed to WTNO-LP on December 12, 1997.

The station was licensed for digital operation as a Class A service effective May 28, 2015, and changed its call sign to WTNO-CD on September 27, 2022.

Subchannels
The station's digital signal is multiplexed:

References

External links
Estrella TV official website

Innovate Corp.
Television stations in New Orleans
Television channels and stations established in 1995
Low-power television stations in the United States
1995 establishments in Louisiana